Mahmudabad-e Yek (also Romanized as Maḩmūdābād-e Yek; also known as Maḩmūdābād) is a village in Negar Rural District, in the Central District of Bardsir County, Kerman Province, Iran. At the 2006 census, its population was 99, in 25 families.

References 

Populated places in Bardsir County